The New Towns Acts were a series of Acts of the Parliament of the United Kingdom to found new settlements or to expand substantially existing ones, to establish Development Corporations to deliver them, and to create a Commission to wind up the Corporations and take over their assets and liabilities. Of these, the more substantive acts were the New Towns Act 1946 and the Town Development Act 1952. 
"The New Towns Act [1946] was intended to pre-emptively direct urban growth and infrastructural development into new towns, thereby decentralising population and economic opportunity while inhibiting urban sprawl."

New Towns were developed in three generations.
The first generation set up in the late 1940s concentrated predominantly on housing development on green belt sites, making provision for rail and seldom for cars; eight were in a ring around London.
The second generation in the early 1960s included a wider mix of uses and used more innovative architecture.
The third generation towns were larger and tended to be designed around car travel.

By 2002, about 2 million people were housed in the New Towns, in about 500,000 homes.

Background
The 1944 Abercrombie Plan for London proposed eight new towns within  of London for up to 500,000 people from inner London. Similar recommendations were made for other major conurbations including Manchester and Birmingham. The 1945 Attlee Government set up a New Towns Commission to formally consider how best to repair and rebuild urban communities ravaged in World War II.

In 1945, John Reith, 1st Baron Reith was appointed as chair of the New Towns Commission. The commission concluded that there was a need to construct new towns using the instrument of development corporations supported by central government. The New Towns Act 1946 cemented this vision in 1946 and New Towns were born.

Reith Commission
The Reith Commission recommended that:
the new town developments should have a population of up to 60,000
they should be built as far as possible on greenfield sites
there should be predominantly single family housing at low density
the homes had to be organised in neighbourhoods around a primary school and nursery schools, a pub and shops selling staple foods
there should be a balance of housing and jobs

New Towns Act 1946
  
The New Towns Act 1946 was the act that put into law the conclusions of the New Towns Commission. ") The act authorised the government to designate areas as new towns, and passing development control functions to a New Town Development Corporation. Several new towns were created in the years following its passing.  The Act was replaced by the New Towns Act 1965 and, later, the New Towns Act 1981.

New Town Development Corporations

The act set up Development Corporations which were responsible for the management, design and development of New Towns.
These were Public Corporations financed by the Government through Treasury loans. The boards were appointed by Central Government;
importantly, they were given planning and compulsory purchase order powers.

Their first task was to draw up development frameworks for a mix of housing, offices, industrial development, transport infrastructure and open space.

Town Development Act 1952

Although not formally a "New Towns Act", the Town Development Act uses the powers established by the 1946 Act to expand existing towns to achieve the same or similar purposes. The introduction to the act gives its purpose: "An Act to encourage town development in county districts for the relief of congestion or over-population elsewhere, and for related purposes, [etc]". It was this act that enabled London County Council to establish its overspill estates as far away as Cornwall and Northamptonshire. By 1973, over 40 new and expanded towns were described in Parliament as "London overspill". The Act, despite being "obscure and almost forgotten", is credited as having a "significant effect upon the pattern of urban development" in the UK.

New Towns Acts 1952, 1953, 1955, 1958, 1964, 1966 and 1969
These were brief acts to increase the maximum borrowings permitted to fund the developments.

New Towns Act 1959

The New Towns Act 1959 established the Commission for New Towns. Under this Act, "the Minister of Housing and Local Government was authorised to set up a Commission on New Towns to take over the functions of the development corporations whose purposes had, in his opinion, been achieved or substantially achieved".

New Towns Act 1965

The New Towns Act 1965 substantially rewrote and consolidated the 1946 act. While continuing the authority to establish further new towns, the act gives the Commission for the New Towns the task of "taking over, holding, managing and turning to account the property previously vested in the development corporation for a new town".

Several new towns were created in the years following its passing. Its most immediate use was the designation of Milton Keynes in 1967, which was envisaged to become a "new city" of 250,000 people. The 1965 act replaced the 1946 act and was replaced in turn by the 1981 act.

New Towns Act (Northern Ireland) 1965

Since most of the acts did not apply to Northern Ireland (and some not to Scotland), an equivalent act was passed in 1965 by the Parliament of Northern Ireland. Following the act, Craigavon was designated in July 1965.

New Towns (Scotland) Act 1968
The New Towns (Scotland) Act 1968 established equivalent legal powers in Scotland.

New Towns Acts 1971, 1975, 1976, 1977, 1980, 1982 and 1987
Few of these Acts are available online, so their purpose remains to be identified. The 1982 act permits an increase in authorised borrowing.

New Towns (Amendment) Act 1976
Among other functions, this act provided for "the interest of the Commission for the New Towns and [the] development corporations in dwellings and of any associated property, rights, liabilities and obligations" to be transferred to district councils.

New Towns (Scotland) Act 1977
This act amended the Scotland act of 1968, notably to include the option to cancel a new town proposal.

New Towns Act 1981
The New Towns Act 1981  is an "Act to consolidate certain enactments relating to new towns and connected matters, being (except for section 43 of the New Towns Act 1965 and sections 126 and 127 of the Local Government, Planning and Land Act 1980 and certain related provisions) enactments which apply only to England and Wales."

Enterprise and New Towns (Scotland) Act 1990
This act replaced the Scottish Development Agency and the Highlands and Islands Development Board with Scottish Enterprise and Highlands and Islands Enterprise, and authorised development of further new towns in Scotland.

New Towns (Amendment) Act 1994
This act establishes sub-committees of the Commission for New Towns, with authority to act on matters proper to them.

Towns

The following towns were created under various New Towns Acts:

England

Scotland

Wales

Northern Ireland

See also
Millennium Communities Programme
English land law
Town and country planning in the United Kingdom

Similar spelling
 Newtown Act 1747–8 act of the Parliament of Ireland

Notes

References

Sources

External links

United Kingdom Acts of Parliament 1946
United Kingdom Acts of Parliament 1959
United Kingdom Acts of Parliament 1964
United Kingdom Acts of Parliament 1965
United Kingdom Acts of Parliament 1981
English land law